nv is the second studio album by Battery, released in May 1995 by COP International.

Track listing

Personnel 
Adapted from the nv liner notes.

Battery
 Maria Azevedo – lead vocals, instruments
 Shawn Brice – instruments, engineering
 Evan Sornstein – instruments

Production and additional personnel
 Battery – production, engineering, mixing
 Curium Design – photography, design
 Christian Petke – production, engineering, mixing

Release history

References

External links 
 nv at Discogs (list of releases)

1995 albums
COP International albums
Battery (electro-industrial band) albums